The Hours of Philip the Good refers to one of at least two illuminated books of hours produced for Philip the Good. The first of these (c. 1416) is in the Bibliothèque Nationale, Paris, and the second (1454–55) in the National Library of the Netherlands, The Hague.

The book in Paris includes miniatures attributed to the Boucicaut Master.

The book in the Netherlands was probably written by Jean Miélot, secretary to the duke, and illuminated by Jean Le Tavernier. It consists of 341 pages, each 27 cm x 19 cm, and contains 165 miniatures, each painted in grisaille.

References

Sources
Lieftinck, G. I. "Grisailles in the Book of Hours of Philip the Good in The Hague and the Master of Mary of Burgundy". Oud Holland, Volume 85, No. 4, 1970

Bibliothèque nationale de France collections
Philip the Good
15th-century illuminated manuscripts